In basketball, a free throw is an unopposed attempt to score points from behind the free throw line. The EuroLeague's free throw percentage leader is the player with the highest free throw percentage in a given season.

To qualify as a leader for the free throw percentage, a player must play in at least 60 percent of the total number of possible games.

Nando de Colo and Šarūnas Jasikevičius are the only players in league history to lead the league in free throw percentage multiple occasions.

Free throw Percentage leaders

FIBA Euroleague Era (1996–2000)

Euroleague Era (2000–Present)

Notes

References

EuroLeague statistics
Basketball in Lithuania
Basketball in Russia